Sooraj Pancholi (born 9 November 1990) is an Indian actor who appears in Hindi-language films. The son of actors Aditya Pancholi and Zarina Wahab, he debuted with the romantic action film Hero (2015) for which he won a Filmfare award for Best Newcomer. He next played a soldier in Satellite Shankar (2019).

Early life
Pancholi was born on 9 November 1990 to Aditya Pancholi and Zarina Wahab in Mumbai. His parents are also Bollywood actors  He has a sister Sana Pancholi, and his grandfather Rajan Pancholi was a filmmaker.

Career

Sooraj was an assistant director on films such as Guzaarish and Ek Tha Tiger. In 2015, he made his acting debut in the romantic action film Hero, which earned him a Filmfare Award for Best Newcomer in 2016. He then acted in Satellite Shankar which released on 8 November 2019. He has also been cast in the upcoming Indian dance film Time to Dance. He has also appeared in the music videos GF BF (2016)  and Dim Dim Lights (2019).

Personal life
In 2013, Pancholi dated actress Jiah Khan, who died of suicide in June of that year. Based on Khan's suicide note, which blamed the couple's strained relationship as a reason for her death, Pancholi was arrested and interviewed under suspicion he abetted Khan's suicide. The suicide note reportedly stated that Khan was subject to torture and abuse by Pancholi. In 2018 Pancholi was formally charged with abetting Khan's suicide.

The criminal case was expected to begin in March 2018, but , it had not begun yet, which Pancholi attributed to Khan's mother's refusal to proceed. Pancholi has denied involvement in Khan's death, describing himself as a scapegoat for her decision to end her life.

Filmography

Films

Music videos

Awards

See also
List of Indian film actors

References

External links

 
 
 

1987 births
Living people
Indian male film actors
Male actors in Hindi cinema
Male actors from Mumbai
Filmfare Awards winners
International Indian Film Academy Awards winners
21st-century Indian male actors